The table below details the non-championship Formula One results for Scuderia Ferrari's factory team-entered and privately entered Formula One cars since 1955 in a separate list.

Non-championship Formula One results
(key)

References

Formula One constructor results
Ferrari in motorsport